John Henry Whitley (8 February 1866 – 3 February 1935), often known as J. H. Whitley, was a British politician and Georgist. He was the final Liberal to serve as Speaker of the House of Commons, a role he held from 1921 to 1928.

Family and early career 
Whitley was born in Halifax, Yorkshire, on 8 February 1866 son of Nathan Whitley (1830–1889) from Ovenden. Nathan went on to serve as Mayor of Halifax (1876–1877), succeeding his cousin-in-law Edward Crossley, the son of Joseph Crossley (1813-1868), a partner in John Crossley & Sons carpet factory, Halifax.

After an early education boarding at Wiseman's House, Clifton College, Whitley entered his uncle Samuel Whitley's cotton spinning business, S. Whitley & Co. at Hanson Lane Mills, Skircoat, Halifax. Nathan was a partner in the business and took over after Samuel's death in 1884.

In 1892, Whitley married Margherita (Margaret) Virginia Marchetti. Margherita was born in Putney in 1872, a daughter of an Italian, Giulio (Julian) Marchetti, who had served as an officer under Garibaldi before settling in England to marry Anne Crossley in Halifax in 1871 and take his place in the carpet manufacturing business.

They had two daughters and two sons: Margaret Phyllis b.1895; Percival Nathan b.1893; Monica Virginia b.1903; and Oliver John b.1912. Margherita died in 1925 and John Henry remarried in 1928 to Helen Clarke in Chelsea.

Political career

Pre-war 
Whitley became Liberal Member of Parliament (MP) for
Halifax in 1900, a seat he held until he resigned in 1928. He served as Junior Lord of the Treasury from 1907 to 1910 in the Liberal Government 1905-1915. He was appointed Deputy Chairman of Ways and Means 1910–1911, Privy Counsellor in 1911 and he held the role of Chairman of Ways and Means, Deputy Speaker of the House of Commons, from 1911 to 1921.

Whitley Councils 

During World War I, in 1917, Whitley was appointed to chair a committee to report on 'the Relations of Employers and Employees' in the wake of the establishment of the Shop Stewards Movement and the widespread protest action against dilution. The smooth running of industry was vital to the war effort so maintaining good industrial relations was a priority.

He proposed a system of regular formal consultative meetings between workers and employers, known to this day as "Whitley Councils".  These would be empowered to cover any issue related to pay and conditions of service, and to take matters through to arbitration if necessary. This was a strong model which was to influence industrial relations beyond the UK.

The intention was to establish Whitley councils in the private sector, in particular in those industries most affected by the strike wave – to offset the demand for 'workers' control' – a demand which was rapidly gaining ground after the Russian revolution.

However, the councils failed to gain ground in coal, cotton, engineering and other heavy industries, but succeeded only in the sphere of government employment where they remain a major feature of public sector industrial relations to this day.

Speaker 

Whitley was appointed Speaker of the House of Commons in 1921, a post he held until 1928, when he resigned on grounds of ill health. He refused the customary peerage offered by the monarch – breaking a tradition that had originated in 1789.

Some notable portraits of Whitley were commissioned during this period, with paintings by both William Rothenstein and Glyn Warren Philpot.

Post-Parliament 

Despite resigning as MP and Speaker, his political work continued. He chaired the Royal Commission on Labour in India, which reported in 1931. The report surprised many by concurring with the criticisms of Mahatma Gandhi and others that poverty was the cause of India's social and industrial problems. It was also critical of British employers' role in perpetuating the problems.

Whitley was offered a knighthood for his work on this report, but again, he, like a minority of others, declined.

BBC 

His friendship with John Reith led to his appointment as Chairman of the Board of Governors of the BBC in 1930. In 1932, he made the first broadcast on the Empire Service, which developed into the World Service. He held the Chairmanship until his death.

Death and burial 
Whitley died on 3 February 1935, aged 68, shortly before his 69th birthday. He is buried in Plot 456, Lister Lane Cemetery, Halifax.

Works

The John Henry Whitley archive 
The personal archive of John Henry Whitley was donated to the Archives and Special Collections of the University of Huddersfield in 2012.

Honours
A blue plaque was to Whitley erected by the Halifax Civic Trust.

References

External links 
 
 

1866 births
1935 deaths
Chairmen of the BBC
People from Halifax, West Yorkshire
People educated at Clifton College
Liberal Party (UK) MPs for English constituencies
Members of the Privy Council of the United Kingdom
Speakers of the House of Commons of the United Kingdom
BBC Governors
UK MPs 1900–1906
UK MPs 1906–1910
UK MPs 1910
UK MPs 1910–1918
UK MPs 1918–1922
UK MPs 1922–1923
UK MPs 1923–1924
UK MPs 1924–1929
Georgist politicians